Dzongka or Zongga
is a town and the administrative headquarters of Gyirong County in the southwestern Tibet region of China bordering Nepal. Being the administrative headquarters, it is also sometimes referred to as "Gyirong Dzong" or "Gyirong Town", but it is different from the original Kyirong Town in the southern part of the county.

Dzongka and Gyirong County were on the ancient trade route between the Kathmandu Valley and Tibet. During the 18th century, the region faced an invasion from Nepal, which resulted in some destruction of the town.

Name 
"Dzongka" means "mud wall" in Tibetan. The town had eight-metre-high mud walls around it, which is believed to have led to this popular name. The original name of the town, as well as the region, was Gungthang (var: Gungtang).

Geography 

The Kyirong Tsangpo valley, which continues into Nepal as the Trishuli River, has provided the ancient trade route between the Kathmandu valley and Tibet.

The Dzongka township contains six villages in addition to its own town community: Phula, Jiamu village, Gong village, Tsalung (Zalong), Xia village, and Orma (Woma village).

History

Early and medieval 

Dzongka was the capital of the kingdom of Gungthang, which covered the upper Kyirong Tsangpo valley (while Kyirong Town was the capital of Mangyul—the lower Kyirong valley). The walled fortification of the town is said to have been built by a king named Chen Lhamchok De (gcen lha-mchog lde), often called Dolé.

Gungthang, along with the neighbouring kingdom of Lo (now in Nepal), were regarded as part of Ngari Me ("Lower Ngari"). The entire Ngari region, which was originally part of the Zhangzhung kingdom, was conquered by Central Tibet around 645 AD. In the 8th century, Indian Buddhist preachers such as Padmasambhava and Śāntarakṣita
visited Tibet using the route through Nepal and Gungthang.

By the 10th century, the Central Tibetan empire fragmented with rival factions fighting for power and regional power centres rising. In 910 AD, the Tibetan ruler Depal Khortsen was murdered, and his two sons fled to Ngari. The elder son, Kyide Nyimagon, went to establish a kingdom in Ngari To ("Upper Ngari") and the younger son, Tashi Tsekpa-pel (Bkra-shis-brtsegs-pa-dpal), came to Ngari Me, establishing the Gungthang kingdom at Dzongka. The descendants of Tashi Tsekpa continued to rule Gungthang till the eventual absorption into Tsang in the 17th century.

Milarepa (1040–1123), called Tibet's greatest poet-saint, was born at Tsalung, a village in the Dzongka township. He was a contemporary of the ruler Lhamchok De. Milarepa spent a good part of his life at Drakar Taso ("eagle's nest"), a hermitage on the border between Gungthang and Mangyul.

In the late 12th century, a Gungthang princess was sent to Sakya as the third consort of Zangtsa Sonam Gyeltsen (zangs tsha bsod nams rgyal mtshan). This obtained for Gungthang the powerful protection of the Sakya hierarchs. As the Sakya allied with the Mongols, Gungthang became an important power centre in Ngari.
In 1290, the forces of Kublai Khan fought those of the Chagatai Khanate at Dzongka over the control of Tibet, and defeated them.

With the decline of Sakya and the Mongol Yuan dynasty, Gungthang's period of ascendance came to an end in the 14th century. For a time, Gungthang was eclipsed by Yatse, but it continued nevertheless with a reduced status. In 1620, the kingdom was sacked by Tsang and became part of Central Tibet. In 1642, the Ganden Phodrang administration under the Fifth Dalai Lama was established by the Mongols over the whole of Central Tibet.

Modern

Maps

See also
List of towns and villages in Tibet

Notes

References

Bibliography

External links

Gyirong County
Populated places in Shigatse
Township-level divisions of Tibet